Taking a knee can refer to

 Genuflection, the act of dropping to one knee as a sign of worship or respect
 Taking the knee, a form of anti-racism protest which originated in U.S. national anthem protests (2016–present)
 Quarterback kneel
 Kneeling, any of numerous customs involving placing one or both knees on the ground

See also
 Kniefall von Warschau ("Warsaw genuflection"), a gesture of humility and penance by West German Chancellor Willy Brandt in 1970 towards the victims of the Warsaw Ghetto Uprising